Anacortes is a city in Skagit County, Washington, United States. The name "Anacortes" is an adaptation of the name of Anne Curtis Bowman, who was the wife of early Fidalgo Island settler Amos Bowman. Anacortes' population was 17,637 at the time of the 2020 census. It is one of two principal cities of and included in the Mount Vernon-Anacortes Metropolitan Statistical Area.

Anacortes is known for the Washington State Ferries dock and terminal serving Lopez Island, Shaw Island, Orcas Island, and San Juan Island, as well as Victoria, British Columbia (via Sidney, British Columbia), on Vancouver Island. There is also a Skagit County-operated ferry that serves Guemes Island, a residential island located across Guemes Channel, north of Anacortes.

History
Anacortes is within the historical territory of the Samish people. Anacortes was officially incorporated on May 19, 1891.

In 1877, railroad surveyor and town founder Amos Bowman moved his family to the northern tip of Fidalgo Island. Bowman began promoting the area as an obvious terminus for the Northern Pacific Railway as it was built through the north Cascades to the Pacific. Bowman established the town's first newspaper, The Northwest Enterprise, to promote his vision of the New York of the West.

Seattle and Northern Company began building a rail line from the town in 1888. Real estate and development boomed from 1888 to 1890 as a result of the railroad rumors, and the Oregon Improvement Company posted $15 million in bonds to develop the town.

In 1891, the real estate bubble burst. Speculators lost money and the Oregon Improvement Company could no longer afford to complete tracks over the Cascades. The town failed to become the railroad terminus Bowman had envisioned.

After the bust, the town became prominent for its fishing tradition, thriving canning industry, and timber mills.

Geography
Anacortes is on Fidalgo Island.

Climate
According to the Köppen climate classification system, Anacortes has a warm-summer Mediterranean climate (Csb) with cool, rainy winters and warm, dry summers.

Demographics

2010 census
As of the census of 2010, there were 15,778 people, 6,980 households, and 4,461 families residing in the city. The racial makeup of the city was 91.5% White, 0.7% African American, 1.0% Native American, 1.9% Asian, 0.1% Pacific Islander, 1.6% from other races, and 3.3% from two or more races. Hispanic or Latino of any race were 5.0% of the population.

There were 6,980 households, of which 24.3% had children under the age of 18 living with them, 51.5% were married couples living together, 9.0% had a female householder with no husband present, 3.5% had a male householder with no wife present, and 36.1% were non-families. 29.5% of all households were made up of individuals, and 14.3% had someone living alone who was 65 years of age or older. The average household size was 2.25 and the average family size was 2.75.

The median age in the city was 47.2 years. 19.6% of residents were under the age of 18; 6.3% were between the ages of 18 and 24; 21.4% were from 25 to 44; 29.9% were from 45 to 64; and 22.9% were 65 years of age or older. The gender makeup of the city was 47.9% male and 52.1% female.

Description

Anacortes is on Fidalgo Island. Rosario Strait and the San Juan Islands are to the West while to the South, Deception Pass separates Fidalgo and Whidbey Islands. To the East, the Swinomish Channel separates Fidalgo Island from the mainland. The weather is milder than other areas of the Pacific Northwest, because it lies within the Olympic Mountain rain shadow. Fidalgo Island gets 21 inches of rain per year, only half as much as Seattle.

First known as Ship Harbor, Anacortes was established with a name and a post office in 1879 in the vain hope that it would be selected as the western terminus of the transcontinental railroad. The town was officially incorporated in 1891 shortly after the railroad bust, and became a lumber and fishing center.

In the 1950s, oil companies built big refineries near Anacortes. Two of the five refineries operating in Washington are located near the town. One is owned and operated by Marathon Petroleum (opened in 1955, it was originally built and owned by Shell Oil and later operated by Andeavor [formerly Tesoro]), operating as the Marathon Anacortes Refinery, the other was owned and operated by Shell Puget Sound Refinery Company (opening in 1957, and originally built and owned by Texaco). However, HollyFrontier has now bought the refinery. Refining remains the area's largest industry, but the economic base now includes yacht construction/shipbuilding, tourism.

Government
Anacortes has a mayor–council government with an elected mayor and seven city councilmembers, of whom three are elected from single member wards. The remaining four are elected at-large.

The city government operates a municipal broadband system that began operation as a pilot in late 2019 and will expand to the entire city in 2023.

Recreation and tourism

Anacortes is a popular destination for boaters and those traveling on to the San Juan Islands. The city maintains a  city park on the northwestern end of Fidalgo Island named "Washington Park". This park features camping, boat launching, and views of the San Juan Islands. The most prominent view is of Cypress Island.
As a result of Anacortes' proximity to the Strait of Juan de Fuca, the area provides opportunities for whale-watching.  The waters off of Anacortes and Fidalgo Island are home to several varieties of marine-life, including three resident Orca pods.

In adjacent Mount Erie Park, a number of rock climbing routes are popular on the cliffs of the south and west faces of Mount Erie. Mount Erie offers scenic vistas from its 1273-foot peak.

Anacortes hosts many long-distance cyclists, as it is the western terminus of the Adventure Cycling Association's Northern Tier cross-country bicycle route, which ends in Bar Harbor, Maine.

Anacortes is also home to The Business, a record store and concert venue voted Washington's best record shop. Founded in 1978, the store is notable for its many musicians who have worked there, including Bret Lunsford, Phil Elverum and Karl Blau. The Business is located in the Alfred Olson Building which is part of the National Register of Historic Places.

Festivals and celebrations
"Shipwreck Day" is a single-day, flea market/town garage sale event held annually on the 3rd Saturday in July. City management accommodates the occasion by blocking off several downtown streets.
What the Heck Fest was an annual festival coinciding with Shipwreck Day. It began in 2001 and held its last festival in 2019. The festival took place at various locations in Anacortes a week in the middle of July. Performers presented music, movies, literature, and art. The thematic center of the festival is the dinner show that includes a full meal along with the concert, an actual community event.
The first weekend of August hosts the Anacortes Arts Festival.  Started in 1962 as the result of the efforts of a group of community arts patrons, the festival is held in the midst of blocked-off downtown main street areas.  Vendors, merchants, and artisans present their wares in covered booths while jazz and blues musicians are showcased on four different stages.
The Oyster Run is an annual one day motorcycle rally held on the fourth Sunday of September.  Beginning in 1981, the event has grown into the largest rally in the Pacific Northwest, with an estimated motorcycle count of 15000 bikes, and growing in numbers each year.
The Anacortes Farmers Market began in 1989 and occurs every Saturday from May to October, with a special holiday market the weekend before Thanksgiving and monthly winter markets from January to April.

Notable people
 Eddie Roberts (born January 20, 1903) Boxer, actor and Seaman.
 Jake Anderson – Fisherman, television personality featured on Deadliest Catch.
 Michael Arrington (born March 13, 1970) Entrepreneur, blogger, dog lover. Founder of TechCrunch and uncrunched.com.
 Richard Bach (born June 23, 1936) American writer, widely known as the author of the hugely popular 1970s best-sellers Jonathan Livingston Seagull and Illusions: The Adventures of a Reluctant Messiah, among others.
 Craig Bartlett – animator, creator of syndicated cartoons Hey Arnold! and Dinosaur Train.
 Duane Berentson – educator, businessman, politician
 Karl Blau – indie rock and folk musician.
 Phil Elverum – independent musician.
 Donald Hume – Olympic rower, gold medalist at the 1936 Berlin Olympics.
 Burl Ives – folk singer, author, and Oscar-ward winning actor, best known for his role of Rufus Hannassey in The Big Country and "Big Daddy" in Cat on a Hot Tin Roof and in the animated holiday television program, Rudolph the Red-Nosed Reindeer.
 Rien Long – former NFL defensive lineman for the Tennessee Titans, 2002 Outland Trophy winner
 Bret Lunsford – independent musician and former owner of The Business.
 The Lonely Forest, an indie rock band, originates from Anacortes
 William Cameron McCool – (September 23, 1961 – February 1, 2003) was a United States Navy Commander, NASA astronaut and the Space Shuttle pilot of Columbia mission STS-107. He was killed when the craft disintegrated during re-entry into the Earth's atmosphere.
 Kathi McDonald – (September 25, 1948 – October 3, 2012) blues and rock singer
 James K. Okubo – (May 30, 1920 – January 29, 1967) posthumous recipient of the Medal of Honor, for service in the 442nd Regimental Combat Team
 Charley Schanz – former Major League Baseball pitcher
 Harry Everett Smith – American music anthologist, experimental film maker
 Lowell Wakefield – founder of Wakefield Seafoods Inc

Sister cities
Anacortes' sister cities are:
 Comarnic, Romania
 Lomonosov, Russia
 Nikaho, Japan
 Sidney, Canada
 Vela Luka, Croatia

See also
 Anacortes School District
 Northwest Educational School District 189
 The Tempestry Project

References

External links

 Official City Government Website
 Chamber of Commerce
 Port of Anacortes
 Anacortes Sister Cities Association
 

 
Cities in Washington (state)
Populated places established in 1891
Populated places on Puget Sound
1891 establishments in Washington (state)
Cities in Skagit County, Washington